John O'Sullivan, CBE (born 25 April 1942) is a British conservative political commentator and journalist. From 1987 to 1988, he was a senior policy writer and speechwriter in 10 Downing Street for Margaret Thatcher when she was British prime minister and remained close to her up to her death.

O'Sullivan served from 2008–2012 as vice-president and executive editor of Radio Free Europe/Radio Liberty. He was editor of the Australian monthly magazine Quadrant from 2015 to 2017.

A former editor of National Review in the years 1988-1997, O'Sullivan has been an editor-at-large there since then.

Early life
Born in Liverpool, O'Sullivan was educated at St Mary's College, Crosby, and received his higher education at the University of London. He stood unsuccessfully as a Conservative candidate for the constituency of Gateshead West in the 1970 British general election.

In 2014 he moved to Budapest, to set up the Danube Institute. He is the Director of 21st Century Initiatives and Senior Fellow at the National Review Institute in Washington, D.C..

Journalism career
O'Sullivan is a former editor (1988–1997) and current editor-at-large of the opinion magazine National Review and a former senior fellow at the Hudson Institute. He had previously been the editor-in-chief of United Press International, editor-in-chief of the international affairs magazine, The National Interest, and a special adviser to British prime minister Margaret Thatcher. He was made a Commander of the Order of the British Empire (CBE) in the 1991 New Year's Honours List.

In 1998 O'Sullivan was a leading member of the journalistic team that founded the National Post, a right-leaning national newspaper in Canada.

O'Sullivan is the founder and co-chairman of the New Atlantic Initiative, an international organisation dedicated to reinvigorating and expanding the Atlantic community of democracies. The organisation was created at the Congress of Prague in May 1996 by Václav Havel and Margaret Thatcher.

In 2013, O'Sullivan became first the director and then president of the Danube Institute, a Budapest-based think tank, for which he is paid an annual salary of 150,000 Euros, indirectly financed by the Hungarian government. The Danube Institute exists to provide an centre of intellectual debate for conservatives and classical liberals and their democratic opponents in Central Europe. Based in Budapest and Washington, D. C., it seeks to engage with centre-right institutions, scholars, political parties and individuals of achievement across the region to discuss problems of mutual interest.

Concurrently, in February 2015 O'Sullivan also became the editor of the Australian monthly magazine Quadrant. In January 2017 he stepped down as editor and become the international editor.

O'Sullivan has published articles in Encounter, Commentary, The New York Times, The Washington Post, Policy Review, The Times Literary Supplement, The American Spectator, The Spectator, The American Conservative, Quadrant, The Hibernian, the Hungarian Review and other journals, and is the author of The President, the Pope, and the Prime Minister (Washington, D.C.: Regnery, 2006).

Philosopher Roger Scruton praises O'Sullivan's book, which "forcefully" argues "that the simultaneous presence in the highest offices of Reagan, Thatcher and Pope John Paul II was the cause of the Soviet collapse. And my own experience confirms this."

He also lectures on British and American politics and is the Bruges Group's representative in Washington DC.

Views

O'Sullivan's first law
He is known for O'Sullivan's first law, or O'Sullivan's law, stating: "All organizations that are not explicitly right-wing will over time become left-wing."

Multiculturalism

In an article, O'Sullivan wrote: "After all, radical Islamists have three advantages on their side: demography (the populations of Islamic nations are increasing while the West suffers a 'birth dearth'); rapidly growing Islamic diasporas in the West, fueled by illegal immigration; and official Western policies of multiculturalism (which not only encourage immigrants to retain their original cultural identity but even promote the 'de-assimilation' of previously assimilated minorities in the West)...the decline of Christian belief and social influence; and the habit of respecting other cultures as unities while treating the West as a kind of multi-cultural supermarket in which Western civilization is merely one rather dusty shelf. To these trends politicians add appeasement, both diplomatic (of neighboring North Africa) and electoral (of local Muslim constituencies)".

On July 18, 2005, O'Sullivan wrote an article titled, "The Islamic Republic of Holland. How One Nation Deals with a Revolutionary Problem".

In a 2017 review, O'Sullivan says "The new policy [encouraging migration] accelerated the transformation of Britain into a multicultural society with racial and religious tensions; terrorist murders, bombings, and beheadings; physical attacks on gays in East London; the extraordinary epidemic of the rape and sexual grooming of underage girls...hostile demonstrations against British soldiers returning from Afghanistan; an estimated (by the British Medical Association) 74,000 cases of female genital mutilation by 2006; the occasional honor killing; and excellent restaurants".

Private life
O'Sullivan currently resides in Budapest with his wife Melissa.

Bibliography

Books

Essays and reporting
 "Cultural Revolutions Then and Now", Hungarian Review, Vol. 11, No. 4, 13 July 2020.
 "Foreword: Making Democracy Irrelevant", in: Mark Sidwell, The Long March: How the Left Won the Culture War and What to Do About It, London: New Culture Forum, 2020.

References

External links

1942 births
English columnists
English political commentators
Living people
Commanders of the Order of the British Empire
Alumni of the University of London
People educated at St Mary's College, Crosby
Speechwriters
English male non-fiction writers
Quadrant (magazine) people
British social commentators
Hudson Institute
Conservative Party (UK) people
Politicians from Liverpool
Conservatism in the United Kingdom